Glyphodes caesalis is a moth in the family Crambidae. It was described by Francis Walker in 1859. It is found in Sri Lanka, mainland India, Myanmar, the Andaman Islands, New Guinea, Bangladesh, Fiji, Hong Kong, Thailand and Australia (Queensland).

References

Moths described in 1859
Glyphodes